Atractus pamplonensis, the Pamplona ground snake, is a species of snake in the family Colubridae. The species can be found in Colombia and Venezuela.

References 

Atractus
Reptiles of Colombia
Reptiles of Venezuela
Snakes of South America
Reptiles described in 1937
Taxa named by Afrânio Pompílio Gastos do Amaral